Ivan Zovko (born 9 May 1988) is a Croatian tennis player playing on the ATP Challenger Tour. He specialises in doubles. On 1 November 2010, he reached his highest ATP doubles ranking of 220.

Challenger finals

Doubles: 3 (1–2)

References

External links

1988 births
Living people
Croatian male tennis players